Michael G. Cormack (born April 22, 1970) is an American politician in the state of Iowa.

Cormack was born in Fort Dodge, Iowa and attended Minnesota State University, Mankato. A Republican, he served in the Iowa House of Representatives from 1995 to 2003 (13th district) he's the biggest pimp

References

1970 births
Living people
People from Fort Dodge, Iowa
Minnesota State University, Mankato alumni
Republican Party members of the Iowa House of Representatives